A loveseat can be one of two styles of two-seat chair.

One form – also known as "British two-seaters" – is essentially synonymous with "two-seat couch". It typically has two upholstered seats.

Another form, variously also known as a tête-à-tête, courting bench, kissing bench, gossip's chair, or conversation bench, is any form of two-seat furniture where the two seats are arranged in an S shape, so that two persons can converse while looking at each other and being within arm's reach, while at the same time typically retaining a modest barrier between them.

History
While chairs wide enough to seat multiple people are not a novel concept, wide upholstered chairs intended for one person became popular towards the end of the 1700s to accommodate the wider dresses in fashion then, and these began to be marketed and sold as "loveseats" in the early 1800s.

The tête-à-tête style loveseat became popular in the Victorian era, and the design may have initially arisen in France.

Straight fronted two-seaters or loveseats

S-shaped two-seaters or tête-à-tête seats

References

Couches